Ancar (Ancar Automóveis de Angola, SA) is a private company in Angola which was founded in 2001 to put a joint venture with Škoda Auto in place and to establish a car assembly line in Angola. Ancar was regarded as a front company of Ancar World Wide Investments Holding, a company with dubious financial European capital, registered in the USA. Today Ancar Angola now does not exist anymore and the project was ceased from both sides, from the German as well as the Angolan side. There were serious corruption allegations against the main responsibles.

History 

The initiators of the project, at that time, were former Škoda Auto board member, Helmuth Schuster, and John Johannsen, searched by the Spanish police with an arrest warrant for serial cheating. Due to dubious business practices of the two, German television channel NDR broadcast on July 14, 2005 on her political program a report about the Volkswagen corruption scandal. According to this news, Volkswagen-Board responded with the dismissal of one board member and additionally ordered to stop the construction of the factory, some  outside the Angolan Capital Luanda. The reputation of Volkswagen in Africa was at stake. It was feared that the partner company is a dummy firm. Volkswagen only continued further negotiations until an extensive review of the company took place and then suspended the project.

Current situation 

However, Volkswagen announced surprisingly in a press release on June 28, 2008  to continue construction works and to open the assembly factory in 2009. An investment of 15 million U.S. Dollars, including the establishment of a nationwide dealer network was planned too. Another Angolan company called ASGM  came in to participate in this project with a capital of 48 million U.S. Dollars. Infrastructure and its associated dealer network are currently placed under Volkswagen of South Africa.

Indeed, the present state is, that the Volkswagen Group, currently has no plans to put this project back to work. (February 2011).

According to the original plans that were in effect in the years 2001 to 2005, this factory would have been just an assembly operation, prior to dismantle cars in Lisbon, Portugal, being shipped as parts to Angola and later to be reassembled. This method would have promised high profit gains to the operators. Due to this procedure, new jobs for the local people could have been created, which was supported by Angolan law.

China comes in 

Because of the complications that led up to the highest government circles, the Government of Angola made it publicly clear to distance itself from the case. (Welwitschia dos Santos, a daughter of President José Eduardo dos Santos participated in Ancar). Instead, on the designated site, the Polo Industrial de Viana, Viana, China International Fund funded a project under the name of a joint venture called CSG - Automóvel fabricado em Angola. Today, there are already built cars like Yumsun Nissan models. (as of 2011).

References

External links
 Deutsche Welle Website, Volkswagen Scandal Deepens
 The Times: The sex and bribes scandal at VW that could finish Schröder
 Angola: Emerging Markets Outlook: Angola, the new Detroit?
 CSG Auto Official Website
 Official Zhengzhou Yumsun Nissan Website

Car manufacturers of Angola
Vehicle manufacturing companies established in 2001